Henry Ferguson (1907–1983) was a Scottish footballer who played as a wing half or inside forward, mainly for St Johnstone.

He spent twelve seasons with the Perth side (they were relegated from the top division in 1929–30 but were promoted again in 1931–32), with short loans to Alloa Athletic and King's Park, featuring solely in the Scottish Cup. He was eventually made Saints club captain, and was granted a testimonial against Manchester City in 1935. Two years later he moved on to Dunfermline Athletic for a single season, followed by a similar spell with King's Park before the outbreak of World War II brought his professional career to an end.

References

1907 births
Date of birth missing
1983 deaths
Date of death missing
Scottish footballers
Sportspeople from Clackmannanshire
Association football wing halves
Association football inside forwards
Alva Albion Rangers F.C. players
St Johnstone F.C. players
Dunfermline Athletic F.C. players
King's Park F.C. players
Alloa Athletic F.C. players
Scottish Junior Football Association players
Scottish Football League players